Leonardo Ximenes (27 December 1716 – 3 May 1786) was a famous Italian Jesuit mathematician, engineer, astronomer and geographer from Sicily.

After having attended a Jesuit school, he became a mathematician, a hydraulic and civil engineer, and was an eminently respected astronomer in his day. The astronomical observatory, Osservatorio Ximeniano in Florence, is named after him in recognition of his services to the field. As a hydraulic engineer, he is known for building canals, including the Imperial Canal in Tuscany. These canals were part of an effort to drain the Lago di Bientina, at the time the largest lake in Tuscany.

Works

References
Italian entry on the Osservatorio Ximeniano
Liceo Ginnasio Statale "Leonardo Ximenes"

References

18th-century Italian mathematicians
18th-century Italian astronomers
1716 births
1786 deaths
People from Trapani
Jesuit scientists